ŽFK Dragon 2014 (Macedonian: ЖФК Драгон 2014) is a women's football club from Skopje, North Macedonia. The team was founded in 2014 and won the national championship in 2014–15 with 18 wins from 18 games. In the next seasons they have won 3 more titles and also achieved a national cup win.

History
The club was founded in 2014.

In 2015 the lost the cup final. In 2016 they won the cup final.

Titles
 4 Macedonian women's football championship: 2014–15, 2015–16, 2017–18, 2018–19
 1 Macedonian Women's Cup winners: 2016

Current squad
As of July 2022

UEFA Competitions Record
The team debuted in the 2015–16 season but finished last in their qualifying group. In the next three seasons Dragon finished with 3 losses out of three games as well. In fact only one goal was scored so far, when Stankica Atanasova scored in a 1–14 defeat to Osijek in 2016–17.

References

External links
Facebook profile
UEFA profile

Women's football clubs in North Macedonia
Association football clubs established in 2014
2014 establishments in the Republic of Macedonia
Football clubs in Skopje